Temple University (Temple or TU) is a public state-related research university in Philadelphia, Pennsylvania. It was founded in 1884 by the Baptist minister Russell Conwell and his congregation Grace Baptist Church of Philadelphia then called Baptist Temple. On May 12, 1888, it was renamed the Temple College of Philadelphia.  By 1907, the institution revised its institutional status and was incorporated as a research university.

As of 2020, about 37,289 undergraduate, graduate and professional students were enrolled at the university. Temple is among the world's largest providers of professional education (law, medicine, podiatry, pharmacy, dentistry, engineering and architecture), preparing the largest body of professional practitioners in Pennsylvania.

History

Temple University was founded in 1884 by Grace Baptist Church of Philadelphia and its pastor Russell Conwell, a Yale-educated Boston lawyer, orator, and ordained Baptist minister, who had served in the Union Army during the American Civil War. Conwell came to Pennsylvania in 1882 to lead the Grace Baptist Church of Philadelphia while he began tutoring working class citizens late at night to accommodate their work schedules. These students, later dubbed "night owls," were taught in the basement of Conwell's Baptist Temple (hence the origin of the university's name and mascot).

The Grace Baptist Church of Philadelphia quickly grew popular within the North Philadelphia area. A temporary board of trustees was created to handle the rapidly growing formalities associated with the church's programs. When the board conducted its first meeting they named Russell H. Conwell president of "The Temple College." Grace Baptist Church appointed a new board of trustees within the following months, printed official admissions files, and issued stock to raise funds for new teaching facilities. The church provided classrooms, and teachers, and financed the school in its early years. Regardless of whether they had the resources to support the school, The church and Conwell's desire was “to give education to those who were unable to get it through the usual channels”.

In addition to the congregational giving and supporting the college, Conwell used the income from his “Acres of Diamonds” speech to fund Temple as a place where working-class Philadelphians might receive higher education.

Philadelphia granted a charter in 1888 to establish “The Temple College of Philadelphia”, but the city refused to grant authority to award academic degrees. By 1888, the enrollment of the college was nearly 600. It was in 1907 that Temple College revised its institutional status and incorporated as a university. Legal recognition as a university enhanced Temple in noticeable ways including its reputation, professional and graduate programs, overall enrollment, and financial support.

Over time, Temple expanded. The Grace Baptist Church of Philadelphia also founded Samaritan Hospital, and Garretson Hospitals, a Medical School was added, and Temple merged with the Philadelphia Dental College. After the merger, Temple officially reincorporated as Temple University on December 12, 1907.

In 1954, Temple University agreed to terms to purchase 11 1/2 acres of the adjacent Monument Cemetery and repurpose it for athletic fields and a parking lot. Families of the deceased claimed about 8,000 of the 28,000 bodies on the site and the rest were moved to an unmarked mass grave at Lawnview Memorial Park. Many of the remaining headstones from the cemetery, including a monument to George Washington and Marquis de Lafayette, were used as riprap for the Betsy Ross Bridge, some of which can be still be seen at low tide.

Since 1965, Temple has been a Pennsylvania state-related university, meaning the university receives state funds, subject to state appropriations, but is independently operated.

On November 29, 2021, the former dean of Temple University's business school was convicted on charges of conspiracy and wire fraud for a scheme in which he and others used false data to boost the school's position on the US News and World Report's rankings.

On January 31, 2023, the graduate student workers' union at Temple University declared an ongoing labor strike, following a year of stalled negotiations for a labor contract. Temple University retaliated on February 8 by terminating the strikers' health insurance and tuition benefits, an action that propelled the strike to national news. Both of Pennsylvania's U.S. senators and the Philadelphia City Council responded in support of the students on February 9, calling on the university to meet the workers' demands.

Campus

Temple University has six campuses and sites across Pennsylvania, plus international campuses in Rome and Japan.

Pennsylvania campuses

Main campus

It occupies .

The campus has landmarks which have accrued over its history. O'Connor Plaza surrounds the Founder's Garden between Polett Walk and Liacouras Walk. The bronze statue of an owl, the university's mascot, is at the centre of main campus.

The Founder's Garden near Liacouras Walk is the burial place of Russell Conwell, founder and 38-year president of Temple. A bust of Conwell marks his grave. The Bell Tower is a landmark of the campus. The surrounding plaza and grassy area is commonly referred to as "the Beach" or "Beury Beach".

Another green area on Main Campus is the Johnny Ring Garden. It is located near Mitten Hall and features a statue of Johnny Ring, Conwell's personal orderly during the Civil War.

Other campuses
Health Sciences Campus in North Philadelphia covers about 20 acres and extends to either side of North Broad Street from Allegheny Avenue to just above Tioga Street. The campus is home to Temple University Hospital, a teaching hospital; the Lewis Katz School of Medicine; the School of Pharmacy; the Maurice H. Kornberg School of Dentistry; and the College of Public Health.

Podiatric Medicine Campus is located at 8th and Race Streets. The Foot and Ankle Institute, the School of Podiatric Medicine, as well as the Shoe Museum, are at this location.

Center City Campus is across the street from Philadelphia City Hall. The Campus offers undergraduate and graduate courses and full degree programs in the evening, as well as non-credit workshops and seminars.

Ambler Campus, originally a junior college, has 325 faculty and 4,600 students, with bachelor's and master's degree programs on a site with a 187-acre (757,000 m2) arboretum,  from Temple's main campus in Ambler, Pennsylvania.

Temple University Harrisburg (TUH), located in Harrisburg, Pennsylvania, has a variety of graduate degree programs, certificate and professional development programs. The campus has an evening and weekend course schedule designed for working adults. The campus is located within the Strawberry Square complex.

International campuses

Temple University, Japan Campus

Temple University, Japan Campus (TUJ) is a branch campus in Setagaya-ku, Tokyo, Japan. Temple University Japan was the oldest and largest campus of any foreign university in Japan, before its move from Minato-ku.

In addition to its core undergraduate program, TUJ has graduate programs in law, business, and education; an English-language preparation program; continuing education courses; and corporate education classes. Temple University Japan became the first recognized foreign university campus in Japan. TUJ's credits and degrees are recognized as being equivalent to those of Japanese universities and it can sponsor visas for international students. Students are also given Japanese student identification cards.

Temple University Rome
The Temple Rome campus is in the Villa Caproni, just north of Piazza del Popolo. The Villa Caproni has living accommodations, shops and restaurants. Its facilities include a 15,000-volume library, a computing center, academic classrooms,  art and architecture studios, an art gallery and student lounges.

Campus police
The Temple University Police department is the largest university police force in the United States, with 130 campus police officers, including supervisors and detectives. All are Pennsylvania-certified law enforcement officers; each receives state-mandated police recruit training at an accredited state police academy.

The campus has more than 600 security cameras and more than a thousand 1000-watt metal halide lamps mounted on campus roofs to mimic daylight. Temple has two mass notification systems for emergencies, TUalert and TUsiren.

Sustainability
The Office of Sustainability was established on July 1, 2008, as a central resource focusing on four key areas: operations, academics, research, and outreach and engagement.

The Ambler campus’ "Ambler College", which is home to the Community and Regional Planning, Landscape Architecture, and Horticulture Departments, changed its name in 2009 to the School of Environmental Design. The campus is also home to the Center for Sustainable Communities, a Sustainability-based research center.

Since 2008, the university has enacted policies that include purchasing from green vendors and conserving water and energy across campus; offered 46 undergraduate courses, 22 graduate courses and 12 General Education courses focusing on the environment and sustainability; set in place programs to administer grants and offer incentives for any research related to the environment or sustainability; and offered programs to help create a green culture, both at Temple and beyond.

Campus development
In 2009, Temple announced Temple 20/20, a framework to guide development at its main campus. Among its goals, it will make Broad Street the center point of the university and include a new library for students and the community; a large new green space; a new science building and a high rise residence hall.

The university in 2014 adopted a new campus plan, Visualize Temple, with signature projects including a new library and quad in the heart of campus. A companion project, Verdant Temple, was announced in 2015 as a university strategy for updating and beautifying the school's open spaces, walkways and landscaping.

Projects

The Architecture building opened January 2012. The design incorporates a glass curtain wall exterior “skin” that allows daylight in to interior studios and classrooms while also providing views of the surrounding urban environment. The open plan of the structure enables collaboration within the design studios.

Mitchell and Hilarie Morgan Hall, a 27-story tower and ten-story mid-rise, opened September 2013. Mixed-use residence life facility contains student residences with 1,275 beds, laundry facilities, shared lobby areas, all-glass, two-story lounges with views of Center City; dining facilities; meeting rooms and event spaces; a major open landscape area; restaurant; coffee shop.

Pearson-McGonigle addition and renovations were completed during 2012. There are new and renovated training and support spaces for recreation services and NCAA Olympic Sports; Division One practice and training facilities for men's and women's basketball; five full basketball courts for students; rock climbing; juice bar; and new academic and advising space.

Science and Education Research Center was complete in spring of 2014. The project will attain LEED Silver certification, and possibly LEED Gold certification due to the innovative design of the facility and the site.

In 2016, the university opened its Temple Sports Complex, adding fields for intramural and club sports. The following year, work was completed on Temple's Aramark Student Training and Recreation Complex, a multipurpose academic, athletics and recreation facility.

On Jan. 18, 2018, Temple President Richard M. Englert announced that the university would take steps to advance its proposal of building a multipurpose facility, including retail space and a football stadium, on campus—including filing a project submission for review by the Philadelphia City Planning Commission.

On July 22, 2019, Temple University closed portions of Polett Walk between Mazur (former Anderson) and Gladfelter Halls to construct a new lobby for Mazur Hall and a green space on the terrace between the two buildings. The construction was completed in the Fall 2020 semester.

Libraries 
The Paley Library opened in 1966 and was designed, as common at the time, as a book warehouse rather than a modern academic library.  After being supplanted by the Charles Library, the building was renamed to Samuel Paley Hall and subsequently housed the College of Public Health, as well as the campus bookstore, relocated from the Student Center.

On August 25, 2019, the university opened Charles Library, a four-story tall study facility. The building was designed by international architectural design office, Snøhetta.  , the library holdings amounted to 4 million physical items, including 1.5 million books, and 1.5 million electronic books.  The library includes both an automated search and retrieval system and browsable stacks for physical volumes.  The library is open to the general public and not restricted to use by university students and personnel.

Academics 

Temple University is classified among "R1: Doctoral Universities – Very high research activity", and has more than 500 degree programs at 15 schools and colleges and five professional schools.

Schools and colleges

Boyer College of Music and Dance

The Boyer College of Music and Dance is part of the Center for the Performing and Cinematic Arts at Temple University in Philadelphia, Pennsylvania, in close proximity to the city's historic cultural institutions, including the Kimmel Center for the Performing Arts, The Philadelphia Orchestra, Opera Philadelphia, Pennsylvania Ballet, Philadanco and the Philadelphia Museum of Art. The Boyer College of Music and Dance is housed in Presser Hall.

College of Engineering
The College of Engineering at Temple University includes five departments: Bioengineering, Civil & Environmental Engineering, Electrical & Computer Engineering, Mechanical Engineering, and Center for Engineering, Management & Technology. The college offers eight undergraduate programs (B.S.) and seven graduate programs (M.S., Ph.D.).

College of Liberal Arts

The College of Liberal Arts at Temple University includes 28 academic departments, offering 35 undergraduate majors and 36 minors. The College of Liberal Arts is housed in Mazur (formerly Anderson) and Gladfelter Halls. The Criminal Justice department is one of the leading criminal justice programs in the United States. The college offers 15 master's degrees and 13 doctoral programs.

College of Public Health 
Temple University's College of Public Health includes the departments of Communication Sciences and Disorders, Epidemiology and Biostatistics, Health and Rehabilitation Sciences, Health Services Administration and Policy, Kinesiology, Nursing, Social and Behavioral Sciences and the School of Social Work. It is one of the largest colleges of public health in the United States. The College of Public Health offers bachelor's, master's and doctoral degrees as well as certificate programs.

College of Science and Technology
Temple University's College of Science and Technology houses the departments of Biology, Chemistry, Computer & Information Sciences, Earth & Environmental Science, Mathematics, and Physics. It is one of the largest schools or colleges of its kind in the Philadelphia region with more than 230 faculty and 4,000 undergraduate students.

The College of Science and Technology offers bachelor's, master's, and doctoral degrees in all six departments as well as science with teaching bachelor's degrees through the TUteach program. CST's advanced Science Education and Research Center (SERC), which opened in 2014, is 247,000 square feet research center, home to 7 research center and institutes. SERC has 52 research labs and 16 teaching rooms, and cost $137 million.

The College of Science and Technology's Mathematics and Computer Science departments are housed in Wachman Hall.

Fox School of Business

The Fox School offers 15 undergraduate majors, 19 minors, 10 professional master's programs, and two PhD programs, and the school has a variety of international partnerships.

It ranked in the top 30 in the nation in the 2017 Times Higher Ed World University Rankings and top 80 in the world for undergraduate studies. The Fox School of Business is housed in Alter Hall.

On March 9, 2020, the Department of Veterans Affairs suspended G.I. Bill reimbursement eligibility for Temple University and several other schools due to what the V.A. said were "erroneous, deceptive, or misleading enrollment and advertising practices", giving the schools 60 days to take "corrective action". The Philadelphia Inquirer states that the action is a result of misreporting by the Fox School of Business. The VA withdrew its threat of sanctions in July 2020.

Klein College of Media and Communication
Klein College of Media and Communication (formerly, the School of Media and Communication) is one of the largest and most comprehensive schools of media and communication in the country. The school has about 3,000 undergraduate and graduate students, more than 20,000+ alumni, and more than 60 full-time faculty members.

The School of Media and Communication was renamed the Klein College of Media and Communication on in 2017, in tribute to broadcasting pioneer Lew Klein, who died in June 2019.

Lewis Katz School of Medicine

In July 2014, Lewis Katz School of Medicine scientists were the first to remove HIV from human cells.

In October 2015, the school of medicine was officially named the Lewis Katz School of Medicine at Temple University in honor of Temple alumnus, former trustee, visionary leader and ardent supporter Lewis Katz.

School of Pharmacy
The Temple University School of Pharmacy (TUSP), on the Health Science Campus of Temple University in Philadelphia, is one of six schools of pharmacy in Pennsylvania conferring the doctor of pharmacy (Pharm.D.) degree. It also confers the Ph.D. (doctor of philosophy) and M.S. (master of science) degrees in pharmaceutical sciences.

Tyler School of Art and Architecture
The Tyler School of Art and Architecture was founded in Elkins Park, Pennsylvania, in the 1930s, when Stella Elkins Tyler donated her estate to Temple University. Tyler moved to a state-of-the-art facility at Temple's Main Campus in Philadelphia in 2009.  In 2019, more than 20 years after Temple's Architecture programs became part of Tyler, the school expanded its name, becoming the Tyler School of Art and Architecture.

Tyler was ranked number 15 in fine art schools in the United States by U.S. News & World Report in 2016.

School of Theater, Film and Media Arts
The School of Theater, Film and Media Arts (TFMA) is part of the Center for the Performing and Cinematic Arts at Temple University, which also includes the Boyer College of Music and Dance. Along with the Center, TFMA was created in 2012.

TFMA offers BA and BFA programs in 13 concentrations in disciplines from musical theater to cinematography, screenwriting to theater design. Graduate programs include MFA programs in Film and Media Arts, Musical Theater Collaboration, Acting, Design, Directing and Playwriting, as well as MA programs in Media Arts and Musical Theater Studies, and a PhD in Documentary Arts and Visual Research.

Beasley School of Law 

The Beasley School of Law was founded in 1895. With a reported enrollment of more than 860 students in Fall 2017, the school trains students with programs focused on trial advocacy, transnational law, and taxation, among others. The school offers full- and part-time programs, offering evening classes for working students. As of 2018, U.S. News & World Report ranked the school the 47th best law school in the United States.

College of Education and Human Development 
The College of Education and Human Development has more than 2,140 students (undergraduate,  graduate programs, and non-matriculated students). Founded in 1919, the college is organized into three departments: Teaching & Learning, Policy, Organizational & Leadership Studies, and Psychological Studies in Education. The college has a longstanding relationship with the School District of Philadelphia, helping to teach and prepare future educators for the city. The College of Education is housed in Ritter Hall.

School of Social Work 
Temple's School of Social Work, part of the College of Public Health, offers full-time, part-time and online programs. It had an enrollment of more than 600 students in Fall 2017.

School of Podiatric Medicine 
Temple's School of Podiatric Medicine is a school of podiatry. The school's Foot and Ankle Institute is the largest podiatric medical treatment facility anywhere, logging more than 40,000 patient visits annually. Students also train through programs through Temple University Health System.

Maurice H. Kornberg School of Dentistry
With nearly 700 students, the Kornberg School of Dentistry has been educating dental students since 1863—making it the second oldest dental school in continuous existence in the United States. The school's clinic offers services including routine dental care and prevention to children's dentistry, orthodontics, emergency care, and implants.

School of Sport, Tourism, and Hospitality Management 
The School of Sport, Tourism and Hospitality Management houses the Sport Industry Research Center and the U.S.–Asia Center for Tourism & Hospitality Research. More than 1,100 students were enrolled in its undergraduate and graduate programs as of Fall 2017.

Foreign study
Temple offers study-abroad opportunities at its campuses in Rome and Tokyo, and semester and summer programs in London, Rome, Japan, Dublin, Germany, France, China, South Africa, Spain, Ecuador, and Australia. Temple University has a global internship program, offering internships in Spain, Costa Rica, Australia, India, Chile, China, Singapore, and various U.S. cities

Technology
In January 2006, the university opened the TECH Center, a  technology facility.

Rankings

In U.S. News & World Report's 2021 rankings, Temple is tied for 46th among U.S. public universities, tied for 103rd among all national universities and ranked tied for 312th globally. Temple undergraduate college is among the top colleges profiled in The Princeton Review's The Best 382 colleges (2018). Temple's Arts and Humanities faculty, Social Science and Management faculty, Life Science and Medicine faculty are ranked 182nd, 339th, 350th respectively in the world in 2014 by QS World University Rankings. Temple's Social Science faculty is also ranked 51-75 in the world in 2016 by ARWU.

In 2017, Temple received $268.4 million in research funding, ranking it 85th out of 901 institutions in the NSF's Higher Education Research and Development Survey.

Student life

As of 2018, about 11,000 students live on or around Temple's main campus. University officials have tried various strategies, including building facilities, to encourage students, faculty, and staff to live and work nearby.

Recreational facilities on and around main campus include the Howard Gittis Student Center, which has a movie theater, food court, underground multi-purpose room, game room, computer lounge, and meeting and office space for student groups and organizations. Exercise facilities include the Independence Blue Cross Student Recreation Center (commonly referred to as IBC), which provides 59,000 square feet (5,500 m2) of fitness facilities; the Student Pavilion, a 4-court field house for volleyball, basketball, badminton, floor hockey, indoor soccer, tennis, golf, and more; and Pearson/McGonigle, TU Fitness, and the Geasey Field Complex. The Recreation Center is part of the Liacouras Center, which also includes the home court of the Temple basketball team and various entertainment venues.

In 2017, the Aramark Student Training and Recreation Complex (commonly referred to as STAR) was built, which includes a new climbing wall and the weight room. There is also academic classrooms for the College of Public Health, administrative offices, a Jamba Juice and a 75-yard turf field.

Traditions
Cherry and White

Cherry and White are the official school colors of Temple University. Temple was the first school in the nation to officially use cherry as one of its colors. The only other current school that uses the cherry and white combination is the Rensselaer Polytechnic Institute in Troy, New York. The only other large university that uses cherry is the University of New Mexico. Cherry is a common motif at Temple, from the Cherry Crusade fan club to the Cherry and White Directory. In 2008, Temple standardized the cherry color to be Pantone Matching System (PMS) 201.

The Temple "T"

The university's symbol, the Temple "T", was designed by students in a graphic arts and design class in the Tyler School of Art and Architecture in 1983. The “T” represents strength and positive character, with the open ends showing the free exchange of ideas that is the hallmark of a Temple education. The Temple T is referenced in the school's cheer, T For Temple U.

T For Temple U

"T For Temple U" is a cheer performed at many sporting events, pep rallies, and school celebrations. The song was written in the 1980s by a member of the Temple University Diamond Marching Band. "T For Temple U" is accompanied by arm motions that create the shapes of the letters T and U. Temple's official fight song is "Fight, Temple, Fight!"

The Owl

The owl has been the symbol and mascot for Temple University since its founding in the 1880s, making it the first school in the United States to adopt the owl as its symbol. The nocturnal hunter symbolized Temple's early mission as a night school for ambitious young people of limited means. Russell Conwell encouraged these students, saying, "The owl of the night makes the eagle of the day." In 1977, Temple introduced "Victor T. Owl," a costumed mascot, which was then renamed Hooter in 1984, and has remained Temple's mascot at sports games and events since. Stella, Temple's live owl mascot, was hatched in 2009 in Washington State and raised by a master falconer. She arrived in Pennsylvania in 2011 and lives in the Elmwood Park Zoo in Norristown, Pennsylvania. Stella is one of two live owl mascots in Division 1 athletics, the other being Florida Atlantic University's Hera.

Fraternities and sororities
Temple has hosted fraternities and sororities for more than 100 years. As of 2018, 28 organizations are part of the Temple University Greek Association, while the Greek population has more than doubled in recent years to more than 1,600 undergraduates.

Student organizations
Temple University has more than 300 student organizations for a variety of interests academic, professional, political and advocacy, service, religious, cultural and international, arts, entertainment, recreation and leisure, and media and publishing.

Temple University Graduate Students' Association
The Temple University Graduate Students' Association (TUGSA), which is affiliated with the American Federation of Teachers and the AFL-CIO, is the only recognized graduate student employee union in Pennsylvania. Formed in 1997, TUGSA is a union that advocates for graduate students that are employed by the university as teaching or research assistants.

Main Campus Program Board
The Main Campus Program Board is a student-run organization that plans the premiere events for the Temple student body. They specialize in large-scale events for the student community on Main Campus, organize trips to locations throughout the region, plan student Homecoming events including the annual Homecoming concert, and host speakers, comedians, and novel events.

Media
The Temple News is the editorially independent weekly newspaper of Temple University. It prints 5,000 copies to be distributed primarily on Temple's Main Campus every Tuesday. A staff of 25 plus more than 150 writers design, report and edit the 20-page paper. In 2008, the paper's Web site, temple-news.com, received the National Online Pacemaker Award from the Associated Collegiate Press. In 2015, the paper also won the print counterpart, the National Pacemaker Award. In 2009, the paper's staff won eight Keystone Press Awards. Templar, Temple University's annual undergraduate yearbook, was created in 1924. During 2017, the yearbook received a national second-place award from the American Scholastic Press Association. WHIP, an acronym that stands for We Have Infinite Potential, is Temple University's student radio station. It started broadcasting using Carrier Current in the Student Center before moving its studios to the TECH center. WHIP also gets increased visibility in a top-five media market as one of iHeartRadio's top college radio stations. Temple also has TUTV, a digital cable station that broadcasts to Philadelphia. TUTV features programs from Klein College School of Media and Communication, other colleges and schools at Temple, community and professional broadcasting partners.

Athletics

Temple University's sports teams are the Owls: a name born from Temple's early days when it was a night school. The sports teams all participate in the NCAA's Division I and the American Athletic Conference (The American). The Owls moved after spending the previous 31 years in the Atlantic 10 Conference (A-10). The field hockey team are affiliate members of the Big East Conference. The Owls are also part of the Philadelphia Big 5, the Philadelphia-area basketball rivalry. Temple University was among the first institutions in the United States to sponsor extracurricular athletic activities for its students when both the football and basketball programs were inaugurated in 1894 under the direction of Coach Charles M. Williams.

Football

Temple's football program dates back to 1894 and currently plays Division I FBS football in the American Athletic Conference.

On December 17, 2012, Matt Rhule [pronounced rule] was named Temple's 26th head football coach. He had most recently served as the assistant offensive line coach with the New York Giants. Rhule was an assistant coach for the Owls for six seasons, ending in 2010-11 when the program went 9–4 and played in the fourth bowl game in school history, the Gildan New Mexico Bowl, where the Owls defeated Wyoming, 37–15 – Temple's first postseason victory since the 1979 Garden State Bowl. In 2015, they posted a school-record-tying 10 wins and 4 losses.

Temple won the 2016 American Athletic Conference Football Championship Game to secure its first conference championship since 1967. On December 13, 2016, Geoff Collins was named Temple's 27th head football coach. Before taking the position, Collins had served as defensive coordinator for the University of Florida Gators that ranked among the nation's best during his two seasons on staff. Collins took the Temple Owls to the Bad Boy Mowers Gasporilla Bowl in 2017 in which the Owls defeated the Florida International Golden Panthers 28 to 3.

The team is currently coached by Stan Drayton.

Men's basketball

The Temple Men's basketball program was ranked fifth in all-time NCAA wins with 1,903 starting the 2017–2018 season. Only Kentucky, Kansas, North Carolina, and Duke have a higher total.

Temple is recognized as having won the first-ever National Collegiate basketball championship in 1938, under Coach James Usilton. That Owls team, which finished with a 23–2 record, won the inaugural National Invitation Tournament by routing Colorado, 60–36, in the championship final. Because the NCAA Tournament was not held until the following year, Temple's NIT championship earned the Owls the first national college basketball title. During the 1950s, the Temple basketball team made two NCAA Final Four appearances (1956 and 1958) under Head Coach Harry Litwack. Litwack would be inducted into the Basketball Hall of Fame after concluding a 21-year coaching career that included 373 wins.

Head Coach John Chaney, who is also a Hall of Fame coach, won a total of 724 career games and took Temple to the NCAA tournament 17 times. His 1987–88 Owls team entered the NCAA tournament ranked No. 1 in the country, and he has reached the Elite Eight on five occasions. He was consensus national coach of the year in 1988.

On April 10, 2006, University of Pennsylvania head coach and La Salle University alumnus Fran Dunphy was named the new Temple's men's head basketball coach after Chaney's retirement in conclusion of the 2006 season. Dunphy had coached the Quakers for 17 straight seasons prior to the move. Dunphy and the Owls won three straight Atlantic-10 tournaments in 2008, 2009 and 2010, with the third marking a conference-leading ninth A-10 title. In the 2011–12 season, the Owls won the A-10 regular season title.

Heading into the 2015–16 season, the program owned a 116-year win–loss record of 1,849–1,024. The Owls' history also includes 48 postseason tournament appearances (31 NCAAs, 18 NITs), two Final Four appearances (1956 and 1958) under Litwack, five regional finals in the last 22 years under John Chaney (1988, 1991, 1993, 1999 and 2001), NIT championships in 1938 and 1969, and two Naismith Basketball Association Hall of Fame Coaches in Litwack and Chaney.

Alumni and faculty

There are more than 320,000 Temple alumni currently living in 50 states and 143 countries. Temple has many notable alumni, such as Bill Cosby, Bob Saget, Daryl Hall, John Oates, Irvin Kershner and Diplo. Temple University employs over 3,100 educators and has a student to faculty ratio of 14:1.

See also
List of colleges and universities in Philadelphia
Universiti Tunku Abdul Rahman, a partner in Malaysia
Japan Campus of Foreign Universities

Notes

References

External links

 
 Temple Athletics website

 
Architecture schools in Pennsylvania
Commonwealth System of Higher Education
Educational institutions established in 1884
Foreign universities and colleges in Japan
Universities and colleges in Philadelphia
Templetown, Philadelphia